Sarah Kate Lavin (born 28 May 1994) is an Irish athlete specialising in the high hurdles. She finished fourth at the 2019 Summer Universiade. In addition, she won a silver medal at the 2013 European Junior Championships and represented Ireland at the 2020 Summer Games.

Her personal bests are 12.79 seconds in the 100 metres hurdles (0.3 m/s, Munich 2022) and 7.97 seconds in the 60 metres hurdles (Serbia 2022).

International competitions

1Did not finish in the semifinals
2Did not finish in the final

References

External links
 
 
 
 

1994 births
Living people
Irish female hurdlers
Athletes (track and field) at the 2019 European Games
European Games competitors for Ireland
Competitors at the 2017 Summer Universiade
Competitors at the 2019 Summer Universiade
Athletes (track and field) at the 2020 Summer Olympics
Olympic athletes of Ireland